José Dinarés (born 5 June 1940) is a Spanish former field hockey player who competed in the 1960 Summer Olympics, in the 1964 Summer Olympics, and in the 1968 Summer Olympics. He was born in Terrassa.

References

External links
 

1940 births
Living people
Spanish male field hockey players
Olympic field hockey players of Spain
Field hockey players at the 1960 Summer Olympics
Field hockey players at the 1964 Summer Olympics
Field hockey players at the 1968 Summer Olympics
Olympic bronze medalists for Spain
Olympic medalists in field hockey
Field hockey players from Catalonia
Medalists at the 1960 Summer Olympics
Sportspeople from Terrassa